This is a list of television series produced or distributed by The Walt Disney Company and its subsidiaries.

Disney Television Studios

ABC Signature (formerly Touchstone Television/ABC Studios/ABC Signature Studios)

20th Television (formerly 20th Century Fox Television)

Touchstone Television (formerly Fox 21 Television Studios)

20th Television Animation (formerly Fox Television Animation)

Walt Disney Television

Walt Disney Television Alternative

The Walt Disney Studios

Walt Disney Pictures

Walt Disney Animation Studios

Searchlight Television

Pixar

Marvel Studios

Marvel Television

Marvel Animation

Lucasfilm

Disney Branded Television

Jetix

Disney Television Animation

It's a Laugh Productions

Steamboat Willie Productions
Steamboat Willie Productions produces live-action programs for Disney+. These programs are copyrighted to Disney Enterprises.

FX Productions

National Geographic Partners

The Muppets Studio

 The Muppet Show (1976–1981)
 Muppet Babies (1984–1991) (with Marvel Productions)
 Little Muppet Monsters (1985) (with Marvel Productions)
 The Jim Henson Hour (1989–1990) ("MuppeTelevision" segments, "Miss Piggy's Hollywood", and "Secrets of the Muppets")
 Muppet Time (interstitial series, 1994)
 Muppets Tonight (1996–1998)
 Bear in the Big Blue House (1997–1999, 2002–2003) (with Shadow Projects)

ESPN

ESPN on ABC

ESPN Films

Freeform and Onyx Collective

Freeform

Saban Entertainment

Television South

Fox Kids Worldwide
 Attack of the Killer Tomatoes (1990–1991) (co-production with Marvel Productions)
 Bobby's World (1990–1998) (co-production with Alevy Productions and Film Roman)
 Peter Pan and the Pirates (1990–1991) (co-production with Southern Star Productions and TMS Entertainment)
 Piggsburg Pigs! (1990–1991) (co-production with The Fred Silverman Company and Ruby-Spears Enterprises)
 Zazoo U (1990–1991) (co-production with Film Roman)
 Eek! The Cat (1992–1997, later retitled Eek! Stravaganza in 1994)
 The Terrible Thunderlizards (1993–1997)
 Klutter! (1995–1996)
 Count DeClues' Mystery Castle (1993; TV special)
 Grunt & Punt (1994–1995) (co-production with NFL Films)
 The Fox Cubhouse (1994–1996)
 Jim Henson's Animal Show (1994–1996)
 Johnson and Friends (U.S. version) (1994–1996)
 Rimba's Island (1994–1996) (co-production with DIC Productions L.P.)
 Britt Allcroft's Magic Adventures of Mumfie (1995–1996)
 Budgie the Little Helicopter (1995–1996)
 Red Planet (1994)
 The Tick (1994–1996)
 Life with Louie (1994–1998)
 Big Dreamers (1996–1998; interstitial series)
 Mowgli: The New Adventures of the Jungle Book (1998) (co-production with Wolfcrest Entertainment, Franklin/Waterman Worldwide and Alliance Entertainment)
 Mad Jack the Pirate (1998–1999)
 Moolah Beach (2001)

DePatie–Freleng Enterprises

Marvel Productions

Onyx Collective

ABC Entertainment
 General Hospital (1963–present)
 The American Sportsman (1965–1986)
 One Life to Live (1968–2012)
 All My Children (1970–2011)
 ABC Afterschool Special (1972–1997)
 Schoolhouse Rock! (1973–1984; 1993–1996; 2002; 2008–2009)
 Ryan's Hope (1975–1989) (co-production with Labine-Mayer Productions)
 ABC Weekend Specials (1977–1997)
 The Littles (1983–1985) (co-production with DIC Audiovisuel)
 Little Clowns of Happytown (1987–1988)
 America's Funniest Home Videos (1989–present; with Vin Di Bona Productions)
 Port Charles (1997–2003)
 The View (1997–present)
 You Don't Know Jack (2001)
 General Hospital: Night Shift (2007–2008)
 The Chew (2011–2018)
 Soul of a Nation (2021–present)
 Mike Tyson: The Knockout (2021)

ABC News

ABC News Studios

Lincoln Square Productions

Disney Platform Distribution

Disney–ABC Domestic Television
Note: Formerly known as Disney–ABC Home Entertainment and Television Distribution.

 At the Movies (originally Siskel & Ebert & the Movies/At the Movies with Ebert and Roeper) (1986–2010)
 Today's Business (1986–1987)
 Win, Lose or Draw (1987–1990; w/Burt & Bert Productions and Kline & Friends)
 Live with Kelly and Ryan (1988–present; w/ WABC-TV)
 Teen Win, Lose or Draw (1989–1992; with Jay Wolpert Productions/Stone Stanley Productions)
 The Challengers (1990–1991; w/Dick Clark Productions and Ron Greenberg Productions)
 The Disney Afternoon (1990–1997; syndicated programming block)
 Saturday Disney (1990–2016; co-production with Seven Network)
 Bill Nye the Science Guy (1993–1998; w/KCTS Seattle, McKenna/Gottlieb Producers, Inc. and Rabbit Ears Productions)
 Sing Me a Story with Belle (1995–1999)
 The LA Thing (1996)
 Debt (1996–1998; w/ Faded Denim Productions and Lifetime)
 Make Me Laugh (1997–1998; w/ Dove Four Point Productions)
 The Keenen Ivory Wayans Show (1997–1998)
 Disney's One Saturday Morning (1997–2002; programming block exclusively for ABC stations)
 Win Ben Stein's Money (1997–2003; w/Valleycrest Productions and Comedy Central)
 Rolie Polie Olie (1998–2004; w/Nelvana, Métal Hurlant Productions and Sparx*/Sparkling Animation)
 Disney's One Too (1999–2003; programming block exclusively for UPN stations)
 Your Big Break (1999–2001; with Dick Clark Productions and Endemol)
 The Ainsley Harriott Show (2000) with Valleycrest Productions and Merv Griffin Entertainment
 Iyanla (2001–2002)
 The Wayne Brady Show (2001–2004)
 Who Wants to Be a Millionaire (2002–2019; w/ Valleycrest Productions, Times Square Studios, 2waytraffic)
 The Eyes of Nye (2005) (distributor; produced by KCTS-TV)
 Legend of the Seeker (2008–2010)
 Katie (2012–2014) (co-produced by KAC Productions)
 On the Red Carpet (2013–2014)
 FABLife (2015–2016; w/ Summerdale Productions)
 Right This Minute (2016–present; w/ MagicDust Television, Cox Media Group, Raycom Media and E. W. Scripps Company)
 Pickler and Ben (2017–2019) (co-production with E. W. Scripps Company, Happy Street Entertainment and Sandbox Entertainment)
 Tamron Hall (2019–present) (co-produced by Summerdale Productions and May Avenue Productions )

Other ABC production companies

Valleycrest Productions

SoapNet
 SoapCenter (2000–2003)
 Soap Talk (2002–2006)
 They Started on Soaps (2003–2004)
 Soapography (2004–2005)
 1 Day With (2004–2005)
 I Wanna Be a Soap Star (2004–2007)
 The Fashionista Diaries (2007)
 Relative Madness (2008)
 Greg Behrendt's Wake Up Call (2009)
 Holidate (2009)
 What If... (2010)

Disney Consumer Products

Walt Disney Studios Home Entertainment

International Content and Operations Group

The Walt Disney Company Latin America

Walt Disney EMEA Productions

Short series

Television films, specials, and miniseries

One Hour in Wonderland (1950)
The Walt Disney Christmas Show (1951)
Dateline: Disneyland (1955)
 (1956)
The Grand Opening of Walt Disney World (1971)
Herbie Day at Disneyland (1974)
Sandy in Disneyland (1974)
Christmas in Disneyland (1976)
NBC Salutes the 25th Anniversary of the Wonderful World of Disney (1978)
Christmas at Walt Disney World (1978)
Kraft Salutes Disneyland's 25th Anniversary (1980)
Kraft Salutes Walt Disney World's 10th Anniversary (1982)
Backstage at Disney (1983)
The Disney Channel Salutes The American Teacher (1983–1997)
Hansel and Gretel (1983)
A Disney Halloween (1983)
A Disney Channel Christmas!!!! (1983)
Black Arrow (1984)
Vacationing with Mickey and Friends (1984)
Samantha Smith Goes to Washington: Campaign '84 (1984)
Donald Duck's 50th Birthday (1984)
Disneyland's 30th Anniversary Celebration (1985)
Ludwig's Think Tank (1985)
Disneyland's Summer Vacation Party (1986)
D-TV Valentine (1986)
Fluppy Dogs (1986)
Walt Disney World: A Dream Come True (1986)
Disney's Living Seas (1986)
D-TV Doggone Valentine (1987)
Golden Anniversary of Snow White and the Seven Dwarfs (1987)
An All New Adventure of Disney's Sport Goofy (1987)
Sport Goofy in Soccermania (1987)
D-TV Monster Hits (1987)
Down and Out with Donald Duck (1987)
Walt Disney World Celebrity Circus (1987)
Totally Minnie (1988)
Walt Disney World 4th of July Spectacular (1988)
Roger Rabbit and the Secrets of Toon Town (1988)
Disney's Magic in the Magic Kingdom (1988)
Mickey's 60th Birthday (1988)
Here's to You, Mickey Mouse (1988)
The Making of Oliver & Company (1988) 
Davy Crockett: Guardian Spirit (1989)
Great Expectations (1989)
Spooner (1989)
The Muppets at Walt Disney World (1990)
Goofy's Guide to Success (1990)
The Muppets Celebrate Jim Henson (1990)
Coyote Tales (1991)
The Best of Disney: 50 Years of Magic (1991)
Lifestyles of the Rich and Animated (1991)
The Dream Is Alive: 20th Anniversary Celebration of Walt Disney World (1991)
Fantasia: The Making of a Masterpiece (1991)
The Making of Aladdin: A Whole New World (1992)
Disney's Young Musicians (1992–1997)
Disney's Christmas Fantasy on Ice (1992)
For Our Children (1993)
Miracle Child (1993)
Walt Disney World Journey Into Magic (1993)
Disney's Night of Magic (1993)
The Wonderful World of Disney: 40 Years of Television Magic (1994)
The Century That Made America Great (1995)
The Making of A Goofy Movie (1995)
The Making of Pocahontas (1995)
The Mickey Mouse Club Story (1995)
The Making of The Hunchback of Notre Dame (1996)
The Hunchback of Notre Dame: Festival of Fun Musical Spectacular (1996)
The Christmas Tree (1996)
Disney's Beauty and the Beast: A Concert on Ice (1996)
The Making of Hercules (1997)
The Making of Mulan (1998)
A Valentine for You (1999)
The Making of Tarzan (1999)
Studio DC: Almost Live (2008)
Prep & Landing (2009)
Prep & Landing: Operation: Secret Santa (2010)
Prep & Landing: Naughty vs. Nice (2011)
The Wizards Return: Alex vs. Alex (2013)
Toy Story of Terror! (2013)
Lady Gaga and the Muppets Holiday Spectacular (2013)
Toy Story That Time Forgot (2014)
We Wish You a Merry Walrus (2014)
Club Penguin: Monster Beach Party (2015)
Disney Parks Presents: A Disney Channel Holiday Celebration (2017)
Mickey's 90th Spectacular (2018)
Disney Hall of Villains (2019)
The Little Mermaid Live! (2019)
The Disney Family Singalong (2020)
The Disney Family Singalong: Volume II (2020)
The Disney Holiday Singalong (2020)
Descendants: The Royal Wedding (2021)
Disney Princess Remix: An Ultimate Princess Celebration (2021)
The Queen Family Singalong (2021)

20th Television

Lucasfilm

Disney Television Animation

See also
 20th Television Animation
 ABC Signature
 Disney Television Animation
 DePatie–Freleng Enterprises
 Touchstone Television
 It's a Laugh Productions
 List of Disney television films
 Lists of Walt Disney Studios films
 List of programs broadcast by American Broadcasting Company
 List of programs broadcast by Disney Channel
 List of programs broadcast by Disney Junior
 List of programs broadcast by Disney XD
 List of programs broadcast by ESPN
 List of programs broadcast by Freeform
 List of programs broadcast by FX
 List of programs broadcast by FXX
 List of programs broadcast by National Geographic
 List of programs broadcast by Nat Geo Wild

References

Notes

Television

Disney